Gouranga Bridge is a 588 m (1,929 ft) long Road bridge that crosses the Bhagirathi River in between Nabadwip and Krishnanager, Nadia in West Bengal. It is the part of State highway 8.

History
In 1972, the then Minister of Public Works, Bhola Sen, laid the foundation stone of the Gouranga Bridge to connect Nabadwip  and Krishnanagar. Gammon India Limited took the  responsibility to construct the bridge. On 16 January 1973, Minister of Public Works of Left Front Government, Jatin Chakraborty inaugurated the bridge. The bridge is built in the  Class-A  stage in terms of carrying load according to the importance and demand of the connecting cities.

References

Bridges completed in 1983
Bridges in West Bengal
20th-century architecture in India